Andy Sokol (born c. 1928) was a Canadian football player who played for the Hamilton Tigers and  Winnipeg Blue Bombers. He previously played football at the University of Western Ontario.

References

1920s births
Possibly living people
Winnipeg Blue Bombers players
Place of birth missing (living people)
Western Mustangs football players